Lighthouse '68 is a live album by The Jazz Crusaders recorded in 1967 and released on the Pacific Jazz label.

Reception

AllMusic rated the album with 4 stars noting: "Feel is what dictates the material and its execution on this set, without unnecessary attention paid to crowd or recording apparatus. This is one [of] the most intimate jazz shows captured on tape during the 1960s. It gives record buyers the sound of a band in full possession of their considerable capabilities, celebrating them in a relaxed environment, playing their own brand of grooved-out '60s jazz".

Track listing 
 "Ooga-Boo-Ga-Loo" (Stix Hooper) - 6:39
 "Eleanor Rigby" (John Lennon, Paul McCartney) - 7:32
 "Native Dancer" (Buster Williams) - 8:52
 "Never Had It So Good" (Joe Sample) - 7:15
 "The Emperor" (Williams) - 8:50
 "Impressions" (John Coltrane) - 6:12
 "Cathy the Cooker" (Wayne Henderson) - 6:22 Bonus track on CD reissue
 "Shadows" (Williams) - 4:03 Bonus track on CD reissue
 "Tough Talk" (Henderson, Hooper, Sample) - 8:01 Bonus track on CD reissue
 "Third Principle" (Wilton Felder) - 8:45 Bonus track on CD reissue

Personnel 
Wayne Henderson - trombone
Wilton Felder - tenor saxophone
Joe Sample - piano
Buster Williams - bass
Stix Hooper - drums

References 

The Jazz Crusaders live albums
1968 live albums
Pacific Jazz Records live albums
Albums recorded at the Lighthouse Café